Regina Gardiner Park is a provincial electoral district for the Legislative Assembly of Saskatchewan, Canada. It was first contested in the 2016 election. The constituency essentially supersedes the electoral district of Regina Dewdney.

Members of the Legislative Assembly

Election results

References

Saskatchewan provincial electoral districts
Politics of Regina, Saskatchewan